The following lists events that happened during 1985 in Laos.

Incumbents
President: Souphanouvong 
Prime Minister: Kaysone Phomvihane

Events

Births
12 June - Visay Phaphouvanin, professional footballer

References

 
Years of the 20th century in Laos
Laos
1980s in Laos
Laos